Greve Fodbold is a Danish football club currently playing in the Denmark Series, the fifth tier of Danish football. The club have played the entirety of their existence in the lower divisions and spent one season in the second tier in 1980. They play at Greve Idræts Center in Greve on Zealand, which has a capacity of 7,000. The ground will receive a 13 million kroner renovation in 2021.

Notable managers

Sten Ziegler
Karsten Aabrink
Jan Kalborg
Morten Eskesen (2006–2009)
Jesper Hansen (2010)
Anders Sundstrup (2010–2011)
Anders Jochumsen (2011)
Jesper Falck (2011)
Finn M. Jensen (2012)
Benny Nielsen (2012)
Erik Rasmussen (2012)
Michael Madsen (2013–2015)
Jonas Borup Jensen (2015–2016)
Henrik Gundersen (2017)
Michael Madsen (2017)
Claus Larsen (2018)
Dennis Hald Olsen (2019–2021)
Anton Moestrup Rasmussen (2021–present)

References

External links
 Official site

Football clubs in Denmark
Association football clubs established in 1935
1935 establishments in Denmark